The total geographical area of Himachal Pradesh is . Population density is rounded to the nearest integer.

As per census data 2011, the total population of Himachal Pradesh is 200

This is a list of the population of the Districts of Himachal Pradesh.

Districts by population